Guazapa is a municipality in the San Salvador department of El Salvador. 

An area is known for fostering—and harboring—FMLN combatants during the 1980s

 Municipalities of the San Salvador Department